Joshua Rose (born 1981) is an Australian football (soccer) player.

Joshua Rose may also refer to:
 Joshua Rose (engineer) (c. 1845 – c. 1910), American mechanical engineer